The Argentina Boxing Federation ( or FAB) is the agency that is dedicated to regulate the rules of boxing in Argentina. It was founded on March 23, 1920.

Champions

(correct as of 30 September 2015)

See also

List of boxing organisations

References

Professional boxing organizations
Boxing in Argentina
Amateur boxing organizations